What Price Glory?, a 1924 comedy-drama written by poet/playwright Maxwell Anderson and journalist/critic/veteran Laurence Stallings was Anderson's first commercial success, with a long run on Broadway, starring Louis Wolheim.

The play depicted the rivalry between two U.S. Marine Corps officers fighting in France during World War I.

The play was notable for its profanity, "toot goddam sweet," etc., and for censorship efforts by military and religious groups. These efforts failed when the primary censorship authority, Rear Admiral Charles P. Plunkett, was revealed by columnist Heywood Broun to have written a far more vulgar series of letters to a General Chatelaine.

The play's success allowed Anderson to quit teaching and journalism, and start his long and successful career as a professional playwright. It was included in Burns Mantle's The Best Plays of 1924-1925.

The play was filmed in 1926 and 1952.

Further reading 
 
 What Price Glory? at HathiTrust Digital Library

References

External links 

Plays by Maxwell Anderson
1924 plays
Plays about World War I
Broadway plays
American plays adapted into films